Reed Hadley (born Reed Herring, June 25, 1911 – December 11, 1974) was an American film, television and radio actor.

Early life
Hadley was born in Petrolia, Texas, to Bert Herring, an oil well driller, and his wife Minnie. Hadley had one sister, Bess Brenner. He was reared in Buffalo, New York, where he attended and graduated from Bennett High School.

Career
Before moving to Hollywood, he acted in Hamlet on stage in New York City, a last-minute substitute for the scheduled actor who failed to appear to portray Fortinbras.

Radio 
In the 1950s, Hadley played Chad Remington on Frontier Town. He also was one of the actors who portrayed cowboy hero Red Ryder on the Red Ryder series during the 1940s.

On September 16, 1950, Hadley was on Tales of the Texas Rangers episode Candy Man.

Television 
Hadley starred in two television series, Racket Squad (1950–1953) as Captain Braddock, and The Public Defender (1954–1955) as Bart Matthews, a fictional attorney for the indigent. He also was a guest star on such programs as the religion anthology series, Crossroads, and on Rory Calhoun's CBS western series, The Texan. In 1959, he played fictitious Sheriff Ben Tildy in "The Sheriff of Boot Hill", with Denver Pyle cast as Joe Lufton. He also guest starred in Sea Hunt Season 4/Episode 4;Vital Error. In 1958 he played a crooked businessman/millionaire in an episode of Wagon Train.

Film 
Throughout his 35-year career in film, Hadley was cast as both a villain and a hero of the law, in such movies as The Baron of Arizona (1950), The Half-Breed (1952), Highway Dragnet (1954) and Big House, U.S.A. (1955), and narrated a number of documentaries. In films, he starred as Zorro in the 1939 serial Zorro's Fighting Legion.

Hadley was the narrator of several Department of Defense films: Operation Ivy, about the first hydrogen bomb test, Ivy Mike, "Military Participation on Tumbler/Snapper"; "Military Participation on Buster Jangle"; "The B-47" (T.F. 1–4727); and "Operation Upshot–Knothole" all of which were produced by Lookout Mountain studios. The films were originally intended for internal military use, but have been "sanitized" and de-classified, and are now available to the public.

In 1945 he narrated “The Nazi Plan”, a documentary film using captured propaganda and newsreel footage to dramatize the Nazis rise to power and was used by the prosecution in the International Military Tribunal in Nuremberg. He served as the narrator on various Hollywood films, including House on 92nd Street (1945), Boomerang (1947), and The Iron Curtain (1948).

Personal life
Hadley and his wife, Helen, had one son, Dale.

Death
On December 11, 1974, Hadley died of a heart attack in Los Angeles. He was 63. He was survived by his wife and son.

Recognition
Hadley has a star at 6553 Hollywood Boulevard in the Television section of the Hollywood Walk of Fame. It was dedicated on February 8, 1960.

Filmography

Film

 Hollywood Stadium Mystery (1938) - Ralph Mortimer (film debut)
 Female Fugitive (1938) - Bruce Dunning
 The Great Adventures of Wild Bill Hickok (1938, Serial) - Jim Blakely
 Sunset Murder Case (1939) - Oliver Helton
 Orphans of the Street (1938) - Miller
 Sergeant Madden (1939) - Lawyer (uncredited)
 Calling Dr. Kildare (1939) - Tom Crandell
 Bachelor Mother (1939) - Polly's First Dance Partner (uncredited)
 Stronger Than Desire (1939) - Flagg's Party Guest (uncredited)
 Man from Montreal (1939) - Ross Montgomery aka L. R. Rawlins
 Zorro's Fighting Legion (1939, Serial) - Don Diego Vega / Zorro
 I Take This Woman (1940) - Bob Hampton
 Ski Patrol (1940) - Ivan Dubroski
 Meet the Wildcat (1940) - Basso—Henchman
 The Bank Dick (1940) - Francois
 Flight Command (1940) - Admiral's Aide (uncredited)
 Adventures of Captain Marvel (1941, Serial) - Rahman Bar [Ch. 1, 11-12]
 Sky Raiders (1941, Serial) - Caddens - Henchman
 The Flame of New Orleans (1941) - Party Guest (uncredited)
 Ziegfeld Girl (1941) - Geoffrey's Friend in Audience (uncredited)
 I'll Wait for You (1941) - Tony Berolli
 Whistling in the Dark (1941) - Beau Smith
 Unfinished Business (1941) - Party Guest (uncredited)
 Sea Raiders (1941, Serial) - Carl Tonjes
 Appointment for Love (1941) - Ferguson (uncredited)
 Look Who's Laughing (1941) - Master of Ceremonies (uncredited)
 Road Agent (1941) - Henchman Shayne
 Arizona Terrors (1942) - Jack Halliday aka Don Pedro de Berendo
 The Bugle Sounds (1942) - Court-Martial Judge (uncredited)
 Jail House Blues (1942) - Boston
 Juke Box Jenny (1942) - Brother Wicks
 The Mystery of Marie Roget (1942) - Naval Officer
 Lady in a Jam (1942) - Man (uncredited)
 Now, Voyager (1942) - Henry Montague (uncredited)
 I Married a Witch (1942) - Young Man (uncredited)
 Wintertime (1943) - Radio Announcer (voice, uncredited)
 Guadalcanal Diary (1943) - War Correspondent / Narrator
 Happy Land (1943) - Off-Screen Narrator (uncredited)
 Four Jills in a Jeep (1944) - Fighter Pilot Dispatcher on Loudspeaker (uncredited)
 Buffalo Bill (1944) - Narrator (uncredited)
 Pin Up Girl (1944) - Radio Announcer (voice, uncredited)
 The Eve of St. Mark (1944) - Radio Announcer (voice, uncredited)
 Roger Touhy, Gangster (1944) - FBI Agent Boyden
 Home in Indiana (1944) - Narrator in Opening Scene (uncredited)
 Wing and a Prayer (1944) - Cmdr. O'Donnell
 Wislon (1944) - White House Usher (uncredited)
 Rainbow Island (1944) - High Priest Kahuna
 In the Meantime, Darling (1944) - Maj. Phillips
 Circumstantial Evidence (1945) - Prosecutor
 Diamond Horseshoe (1945) - Intern (uncredited)
 Don Juan Quilligan (1945) - Announcer of Pearl Harbor Attack (uncredited)
 Captain Eddie (1945) - News Announcer (uncredited)
 A Bell for Adano (1945) - Cmdr. Robertson
 The Caribbean Mystery (1945) - Dr. Rene Marcel
 House on 92nd Street (1945) - Narrator (voice, uncredited)
 Leave Her to Heaven (1945) - Dr. Mason
 Doll Face (1945) - Flo Hartman
 The Last Bomb (1945, Short, Documentary) - Narrator
 Shock (1946) - District Attorney O'Neill
 The Dark Corner (1946) - Police Lt. Frank Reeves
 It Shouldn't Happen to a Dog (1946) - Mike Valentine
 If I'm Lucky (1946) - Jed Conklin, Magonnagle's Campaign Manager
 The Razor's Edge (1946) - Party Waiter (voice, uncredited)
 13 Rue Madeleine (1946) - Narrator (voice, uncredited)
 Boomerang (1947) - Off-Screen Narrator (voice, uncredited)
 The Brasher Doubloon (1947) - Dr. Moss (uncredited)
 Louisiana (1947)
 The Fabulous Texan (1947) - Jessup
 T-Men (1947) - Narrator (uncredited)
 Captain from Castile (1947) - Juan Escudero (uncredited)
 Panhandle (1948) - Matt Garson
 The Man from Texas (1948) - Marshal Gregg
 The Iron Curtain (1948) - Narrator (uncredited)
 Canon City (1948) - Narrator (voice)
 A Southern Yankee (1948) - Fred Munsey
 The Return of Wildfire (1948) - Marty Quinn
 Jungle Goddess (1948) - Radio Newscaster (uncredited)
 Walk a Crooked Mile (1948) - Narrator (voice)
 He Walked by Night (1948) - Narrator (voice, uncredited)
 Last of the Wild Horses (1948) - Riley Morgan
 I Shot Jesse James (1949) - Jesse James
 Rimfire (1949) - The Abilene Kid
 Grand Canyon (1949) - Mitch Bennett
 Apache Chief (1949) - Narrator (voice, uncredited)
 Red Desert (1949) - Narrator (voice, uncredited)
 Riders of the Range (1950) - Clint Burrows
 The Baron of Arizona (1950) - Griff
 Motor Patrol (1950) - Detective Robert Flynn
 A Modern Marriage (1950) - Dr. Donald Andrews
 The Return of Jesse James (1950) - Frank James
 The Killer That Stalked New York (1950) - Narrator (uncredited)
 Dallas (1950) - Wild Bill Hickok
 Insurance Investigator (1950) - Chuck Malone
 Little Big Horn (1951) - Sgt. Maj. Peter Grierson
 The Wild Blue Yonder (1951) - Commanding Officer (uncredited)
 The Half-Breed (1952) - Frank Crawford
 Son of Ali Baba (1952) - Minor Role (uncredited)
 Kansas Pacific (1953) - Bill Quantrill
 Woman They Almost Lynched (1953) - Bitterroot Bill Maris
 Highway Dragnet (1954) - Det. Lt. Joe White Eagle
 Big House, U.S.A. (1955) - FBI Special Agent James Madden
 All in a Night's Work (1961) - General Pettiford (uncredited)
 Gunfight at Comanche Creek (1963) - Narrator (uncredited)
 Moro Witch Doctor (1964) - Robert Collins
 Young Dillinger (1965) - Federal Agent Parker
 The St. Valentine's Day Massacre (1967) - Hymie Weiss
 The Fabulous Bastard from Chicago (1969) - Narrator (voice)
 Brain of Blood (1971) - Amir (final film)

Television

Racket Squad (1951-1953) - Captain John Braddock
Public Defender (1954-1955) - Bart Matthews 
Wagon Train (1958) - Mort Galvin 
Bat Masterson (1958) - Raoul Cummings
The Red Skelton Hour (1958) -  Prof. L. M. Treadway/District Attorney 
Rawhide (1959) - Clement 
The Restless Gun (1959) - Colonel Bromley/Mayor Love 
Perry Mason (1964) as Medical Examiner
Hondo (1967) - Morgan Slade 
Green Acres (1969) - Pilot

Other works

Radio

See also

References

External links

  (as Reed Herring)
 Video Detective filmography

1911 births
1974 deaths
20th-century American male actors
Male actors from Texas
People from Clay County, Texas